The South Montgomery Community School Corporation, often abbreviated SMCSC, administers a total of 5 schools, including 1 high school 1 middle school and 3 elementary schools south of Crawfordsville, Montgomery County, Indiana. Its administrative offices are at 300 North 3rd Street in New Market, Indiana.

The Superintendent is Dr. Chad Cripe

Communities served include portions of Crawfordsville, Alamo, Ladoga, Lake Holiday, New Market, New Ross, and Waveland.

Schools

High schools
 Southmont High School

Middle schools
 Southmont Jr. High School

Elementary schools
 Ladoga Elementary School 
 New Market Elementary School 
 Walnut Elementary School

References

External links
Indiana Department of Education Profile for South Montgomery Community School Corporation
South Montgomery Community School Corporation Web Site

School districts in Indiana
Education in Montgomery County, Indiana